Mary Arden, Lady Arden of Heswall
Dame Frances Ashcroft
Dame Madeleine Atkins
Margaret Bent
Dame Gillian Beer
Dame Ann Bowtell
Margaret Burbidge
David Conner
Anita Desai
Dame Athene Donald
 Lady English
Dame Elizabeth Forgan
Dame Elizabeth Gloster
Dame Rosalyn Higgins
Hisako, Princess Takamado
Patricia Hollis, Baroness Hollis of Heigham
 Elizabeth Llewellyn-Smith
Rachel Lomax
James Mackay, Baron Mackay of Clashfern
Margrethe II of Denmark
Dusa McDuff
Douglass North
Dame Bridget Ogilvie
Pauline Perry, Baroness Perry of Southwark
Viscountess Runciman of Doxford
Sarah Springman
Elizabeth Symons, Baroness Symons of Vernham Dean
Daphne Todd
Dame Margaret Turner-Warwick

References

Honorary Fellows

Girton College, Cambridge
 
Girton College